Bududa District is a district in the Eastern Region of Uganda. Bududa is the chief town of the district.

Location
Bududa District is bordered by Sironko District to the north, Kenya to the east, Manafwa District to the south, and Mbale District to the west.

Overview
Bududa District was created by Act of the Ugandan Parliament in 2010. Before then, the district was part of Mbale District.

Population
In 1991, the national population census estimated the district population at 79,200. During the 2002 national census, the population was estimated at 123,100, with an annual growth rate of 4 percent. In 2012, the population of the district was estimated at 180,600. The male to female ratio is 1:1. The major language spoken in the district is Lumasaba. The national population census conducted on 27 August 2014 put the population at 210,173.

2018 Bukalasi Flood and Mudslide
During the 2018 flood, landslides wreaked this mountainous eastern region as the government made plans to move out residents.
Like the Bumwalukani landslide of June 25, 2012, the Bukalasi Mudslide and Flood occurred on Thursday, October 11, 2018. It was a market day at Bukigai. Many people had returned from the market place and they were relaxing and drinking at Naposhi trading centre when the Bukalasi mudslide suddenly came with water, mud and other debris and deposited them in the trading centre.  It is hard to classify this disaster. Is it a flood? Is it a mudslide? Or is it a combination of the two? The disaster attracted immediate attention from the government. For example, the Minister for Disaster Preparedness, Hon. Hillary Onek came and Muwoya Wekhoola David being the District Inspector of Schools led the team to Sume Junior School which had been badly damaged.  President Yoweri Kaguta Museveni himself came, went to Naposhi and consoled the people who had gathered at Bukalasi playground. The Senior Four candidates had to be relocated to Bulucheke Seconday School where they did their UCE examinations.

Education
Bududa is the administrative headquarters of Bududa District Local Government which was carved out of Manafwa district in 2006. Bududa Town Council has two primary schools, namely, Manjiya Primary School and Buloli Primary School. According to the Senior Inspector of Schools who is also the District Focal Point Person for Strengthening Education Systems for Improved Learning (SESIL),since 2006, the academic performance of Bududa District Local Government has been improving steadily. Muwoya Wekhoola David holds a Master's degree in Education Management and Administration from the Islamic University in Uganda. In 2006, Bududa District had 30 candidates in Division one (1.2%), 623 in Division two (25.8%), 506 in Division three (21%), 345 in Division Four (14%), 643 in Division U (26.7%), 264 in Division X (10.9%) and total 2411 candidates (62% pass rate). In 2007, the district had 31 candidates (1.4%), 612 in Division two (28.2%), 517 in Division three (27.2%), 334 in Division Four (15.4%), 677 in Division U (31.2%), 195 in Division X (8.2%), and total 2366 (63% pass rate). In 2008, Division had 18 candidates (0.9%), Division two had 246 (12.4%), Division three had 539 (27.2%), Division Four had 322 (16.2%), Division U had 860 (43.3%), Division X had 221, and total 2206 (51% pass rate). In 2009, Bududa District had 38 (1.6%) in Division one, 573 (24.6%) in Division two, 619 (26.6%%) in Division three, 363 (15.6%) in Division Four, 538 (23%) in Division U, 187 (9.5%) in Division X, and total 2322 (69%). In 2010, Bududa District had 44 (1.8%) in Division one, 774 (31.5%) in Division two, 611 (25%) in Division three, 365 in Division Four, 526 (21%) in Division U, 138 (5.6%) in Division X, and total 2456 (73% pass rate). In 2011, Bududa District had 83 (3.4%) in Division one, 710 (29.2%) in Division two, 515 (21%) in Division three, 463 (19%) in Division Four, 675 (27%) in Division U, 127 (4.9%) in Division X, and total 2255 (69%). In 2012, Bududa District had 110 (4.5%) in Division one, 894 (36.7%) in Division two, 473 (19.4%) in Division three, 419 (17.2%) in Division Four, 541 (22.2%) in Division U, 152 (5.9%) in Division X, and total 2589 (73.4%%). In 2013, Bududa District had 83 (3.4%)in Division one, 764 (28.7%) in Division two, 652 (24.5%) in Division three, 412 (15.5%) in Division Four, 623 (23.4%) in Division U, 120 (4.5%) in Division X, and total 2657 (71% pass rate). In 2014, Bududa District had 114 (4.6%) in Division one, 896 (36.2%) in Division two, 641 (25.9%) in Division three, 401 (16.2%) in Division Four, 422 (17.1%) in Division U, 98 (3.8%) in Division X, and total 2572 (79.8% pass rate). In 2015, Bududa District had 98 (3.9%) in Division one, 625 (25.2%) in Division two, 616 (24.8%) in Division three, 424 (17.1%) in Division Four, 720 (29.0%) in Division U, 116 (4.5) in Division X, and total 2599 (68% pass rate). In 2016, Bududa District had 115 (4.1%) in Division one, 915 (32.8%) in Division two, 564 (20.2%) in Division three, 556 (19.9%) in Division Four, 643 (23.4%) in Division U, 119 (4.1%) in Division X, and total 2912 (72.9%). In 2017, Bududa District had 80 (3.0) in Division one, 965 (35%)in Division two, 650 (23.7%) in Division three, 515 (18.8%) in Division Four, 454 (16.6%) in Division U, 77 (2.8%) in Division X, and 2741 (80.6% pass rate). In 2018, Bududa District had 113 (4%) in Division one, 932 (33.2%) in Division two, 618 (22.0%) in Division three, 684 (24.3%) in Division Four, 460 (16.4%) in Division U, 132 (4.5%) in Division X, and total 2937 (81.2%). In 2019, Bududa District had 142 (5.0%) in Division one, 980 (34.8%) in Division two, 678 (24.1%) in Division three, 522 (18.5) in Division Four, 496 (17.6%) in Division U, 63 (2.2%%) in Division X, and total 2881 (86.4%), the highest pass rate since the inception of the district.

See also
Bamasaba
2010 Uganda landslide
Districts of Uganda

References

External links
Landslides Bury Five Villages In Bududa

 
Districts of Uganda
Eastern Region, Uganda
Bugisu sub-region
States and territories established in 2006